Natacha Marcucci (born 26 September 1970) is an Argentine former professional tennis player.

Marcucci, a native of San Juan, was ranked as high as nine in the world on the junior circuit. 

While competing on the professional tour she had a career high singles ranking of 234 and  won an ITF tournament in Rio de Janeiro in 1986. Her best performances on the WTA Tour were second round appearances at the 1987 Argentine Open and the 1988 Brasil Open.

ITF finals

Singles: 2 (1–1)

Notes

References

External links
 
 

1970 births
Living people
Argentine female tennis players
People from San Juan, Argentina
Sportspeople from San Juan Province, Argentina
20th-century Argentine women